Zhongguohentomon is a genus of proturans in the family Eosentomidae.

Species
 Zhongguohentomon magnum Yin, 1979
 Zhongguohentomon piligeroum Zhang & Yin, 1981

References

Protura